Chill Master's Screen is a 1984 role-playing game supplement for Chill published by Pacesetter.

Contents
Chill Master's Screen is a three-panel cardstock GM screen printed with the most important charts and tables used in the game.  The bonus adventure with the screen is an 8-page adaptation of the first four chapters of Bram Stoker's Dracula, called Castle Dracula.

Castle Dracula / Chill Master's Screen is a GM's screen with a miniscenario based on the first four chapters of Bram Stoker's classic tale; Vengeance of Dracula is the sequel.

Publication history
Castle Dracula / Chill Master's Screen was designed by Gali Sanchez, with a cover by Susan Collins, and was published by Pacesetter, in 1984 as a cardstock screen with an 8-page pamphlet.

Reception
William A. Barton reviewed Chill Master's Screen in Space Gamer No. 71. Barton commented that "the CM Screen should prove useful to most Chill GMs who like more than an ordinary binder to hide their notes, and the Castle Dracula adventure can be a fun – if potentially deadly – bonus for those times you can't get together an entire play group."

References

Chill (role-playing game) supplements
Gamemaster's screens
Role-playing game supplements introduced in 1984